Manganiceladonite is a rare silicate mineral with the formula KMgMn3+Si4O10(OH)2. It is one of many minerals discovered in the Cerchiara mine, La Spezia, Liguria, Italy.

Relation to other minerals
Manganiceladonite, as suggested by its name, is a trivalent-manganese-analogue of celadonite.

References

Silicate minerals
Manganese(III) minerals
Potassium minerals
Magnesium minerals
Monoclinic minerals
Minerals in space group 5
Minerals in space group 12